A Woman Playing the Theorbo-Lute and a Cavalier is aqn oil on wood painting by Dutch artist Gerard ter Borch the Younger, created c. 1658. The work depicts a young woman playing a theorbo while her lover looks on. The painting is in the collection of the Metropolitan Museum of Art, in New York.

Description
Ter Borch's painting portrays a scene in which a young woman plays a theorbo-lute (a stringed instrument) while her suitor sits nearby. The man is a cavalier, a 17th-century soldier, and he is seen to be sitting atop a cloth-covered table. His sword is laid flat to his left, while a songbook (a common lovers' gift during the time period) rests nearby. A watch, possibly representing temperance or the fleeting nature of the affair, lies near the other objects.

References

1658 paintings
Paintings by Gerard ter Borch
Paintings in the collection of the Metropolitan Museum of Art
Genre paintings